Gunnarella is a genus of flowering plants from the orchid family, Orchidaceae. It and another orchid genus, Seidenfadenia, are named for Danish botanist Gunnar Seidenfaden. It contains 10 known species, native to New Guinea, New Caledonia and to other nearby islands in the Pacific.

Gunnarella aymardii (N.Hallé) Senghas - New Caledonia
Gunnarella begaudii (N.Hallé) Senghas - New Caledonia
Gunnarella brigittae (N.Hallé) Senghas - New Caledonia
Gunnarella carinata (J.J.Sm.) Senghas - New Guinea
Gunnarella florenciae (N.Hallé) Senghas - New Caledonia
Gunnarella gracilis (Schltr.) Senghas - New Guinea
Gunnarella laxa (Schltr.) Senghas - Papua New Guinea to Solomon Islands
Gunnarella nambana B.A.Lewis - Vanuatu
Gunnarella neocaledonica (Rendle) Senghas - New Caledonia
Gunnarella robertsii (Schltr.) Senghas - New Caledonia, New Guinea, Vanuatu, Solomon Islands

See also
 List of Orchidaceae genera

References

Vandeae genera
Aeridinae